Les Harris is the name of:
Les Harris (businessman) (1939–2009), UK motorcycle industry businessman
Les Harris (producer), Canadian television and film producer
Les Harris (footballer) (born 1955), English footballer

See also
Leslie Harris (disambiguation)
Lesley Harris (born 1954), badminton player